The  is a 2-door convertible kei car built by the Japanese car company Daihatsu. It debuted at the 1999 Tokyo Motor Show, as the Daihatsu Copen concept. The second generation model debuted as the Kopen (Future Included) at the 2013 Tokyo Motor Show.



First generation (L880; 2002) 

The Copen was originally designed with a 660 cc turbocharged engine in order to meet Japanese kei car regulations. However, since this engine did not meet environmental emissions standards in several other countries, the Copen was fitted with a more powerful 1.3 L non-turbo engine in these markets in 2007. Styling was inspired by the older Nissan Figaro and actual Audi TT Roadster, which has key elements found in the Copen.

The leading characteristic of this model was the active top, a motorized hide-away hard roof. However, between 2002 and 2007 there existed a variation with a detachable top. This version was about 30 kg. lighter than the regular model.

The Copen was never built with left-hand-drive for the first four model years (2002-2005). The right-hand-drive Copen was officially sold in Germany and some European countries from 2003 to 2005 and with smaller 660cc engine. After a lackluster sale in Germany for the right-hand-drive Copen, Daihatsu introduced the left-hand-drive Copen with bigger 1.3 L engine for non-Japanese markets, which was announced at 2005 IAA Frankfurt, along with new trim level, ZZ. The sales increased to 802 units for model year 2006. The sales number declined greatly from 2007 until the Copen was withdrawn from German market in the summer of 2011. Daihatsu introduced 60 "farewell edition" (Abschiedsmodell) Copen in Germany.

The Copen has been featured on the UK show Top Gear where James May attempted to find the best convertible car. The contestants were the Mercedes-Benz CLK, Audi A4, Citroën C3 Pluriel, Volkswagen New Beetle, and the Copen. May loved the Copen, but he had one small problem: it felt "toy-ish".

On 13 January 2011, Daihatsu announced that it would withdraw the Copen from the European market in 2011 due to the increasing strength of the Japanese Yen and sharp decline in sales from 2006 to 2011. Daihatsu announced on 2 April 2012 that the production for the Copen would cease in August 2012 with the final "10th Anniversary Edition" model. The 500 "10th Anniversary Edition" models were luxuriously appointed with leather upholstery and commemorative 10th Anniversary plate in the door openings.

Second generation (LA400; 2014) 

Less than one year after the car's discontinuation, Daihatsu announced the Copen would be returning to production with a new model. At the 2013 Tokyo Motor Show, Daihatsu unveiled two Copen concept cars called the Kopen, with the tagline "Future Included". The name "Kopen" was a combination of kei class car, and "open" for convertible roadster. The spelling was changed from "k" to "c" for "convertible". Production of the new model was announced on June 19, 2014.

The Copen has been restyled to be more angular than its predecessor with a new monocoque chassis structure called a D-Frame. The structure allows owners to select the interior and exterior design of the car according to their preferences. The body panels are made of 13 separate resin components, 11 of which are interchangeable to modify design and colors. The Copen also features a new suspension system, a new 660cc turbo three-cylinder engine with DVVT , better sounding exhaust system and weight reduction. In Japan, models sold initially were Copen XPLAY, Copen Robe and a special S type for the Copen Robe.

For the Gran Turismo Sport video game, a specially tuned model called the Daihatsu Copen RJ Vision Gran Turismo was included as part of the series' Vision Gran Turismo program of concept cars.

The Copen Robe was officially exported to Indonesia and sold between 2015 and 2019.

Copen Cero 
In 2015, Daihatsu launched the Copen Cero, which is similar in form to the first-generation model.

Copen Coupe 
At the 2019 Tokyo Auto Salon, Daihatsu unveiled the Copen Coupe, a fixed-roof coupé version of the Copen Cero. The CFRP roof features an optional sunroof. Standard features include a Momo leather wrapped steering wheel, limited-slip differential, BBS aluminum wheels, and serialized plates on the center console. Options include a sports muffler and HKS suspension. Daihatsu produced a limited run of 200 units in April 2019 to coincide with the fifth anniversary of the second generation Copen.

Copen GR Sport 
The Copen GR Sport went on sale on October 15, 2019. It is sold under both Daihatsu and Toyota dealership networks (as the Toyota Copen GR Sport). This variant neither carries a Daihatsu nor Toyota logo, a neutral oval-shaped 'C' Copen logo is used instead for the front and rear badging. The Copen GR Sport gets sporty exterior looks with BBS wheels, a Momo-branded steering wheel and a specially tuned suspension for body rigidity.

Gallery

Specifications

2002-2012 Japanese and International Markets 
JB-DETi engine
 0.66L (659 cc) 16 valves turbo DOHC 4 cylinder 
 Power —  @ 6000 rpm
 Power —  @ 6000 rpm for UK market
 Torque —  @ 3200 rpm
 Torque —  for UK market
 Top Speed —  UK version (MT)
 Top Speed —  Japanese version (MT)
 Top Speed —  UK version (AT)
 Top Speed —  Japanese version (AT)
 Combined fuel consumption — 44.1 mpg | 5.4L/100 km
 0–62 mph time — 11.7s (MT)

2006–2011 International Markets, not available in Japan 
K3-VE engine
 1.3L DVVT engine DOHC 16 valve
 Power —  @ 6000 rpm
 Torque —  @ 4400 rpm
 Top Speed —  (MT)
 Top Speed —  (AT)
 Combined fuel consumption — 
 0–100 km/h (0–62 mph) time — 9.5s (MT)

2014 Japanese market model 
KF engine
 658cc 3 cylinder 12-valve DOHC intercooled turbocharged 
 Compression ratio — 9.5
 Power —  at 6400 rpm
 Torque —  at 3200 rpm
Transmission
 Manual — KPMZ 5-speed with ratios 3.181, 1.842, 1.250, 0.916, and 0.750. Final reduction, 5.545. Tires: 165/50R16.
 Automatic — KBPZ CVT with ratio 3.327 to 0.628. Final reduction, 4.800. Tires: 165/50R16.
Body
 Layout — Front-engine, front-wheel-drive
 Weight — 850 kg (MT) or 870 kg (AT)
 Wheelbase  —

References

External links 

  
  (Brand & Fan Community) 

Copen
Cars introduced in 2002
2010s cars
2020s cars
Hardtop convertibles
Roadsters
Kei cars
Vehicles with CVT transmission
Front-wheel-drive sports cars